AEIOU may refer to:
 a, e, i, o, u, a traditional list of vowel letters in the Roman alphabet
 A.E.I.O.U., a device used by the Habsburgs
 aeiou Encyclopedia, a free online collection of reference works in German and English about Austria-related topics
 Aeiou, a cartoon character featured in the older version of Muse magazine
 A.E.I.O.U. (album), a 2005 album by Sistars
 AEIOU, a graphic novel by cartoonist Jeffrey Brown
 "AEIOU", a song on the debut album Waves and the Both of Us by Charlotte Sometimes
 "AEIOU (And Sometimes Y)", a song by Ebn Ozn
 "A.E.I.O.U.", a song by Zion I from Deep Water Slang V2.0
 A.E.I.O.U, a 1983 song by The Europeans
 AEIOU (film), a 1979 Czechoslovak film

See also
 IOU